First for Women is a woman's magazine published by A360media in the USA. The magazine was started in 1989 by Bauer Media Group. In 2011 the circulation of the magazine was 1,310,696 copies.

References

External links
 Official website

1989 establishments in New Jersey
Bauer Media Group
Magazines established in 1989
Magazines published in New Jersey
Women's magazines published in the United States